Railroad Square may refer to:

Railroad Square District in Santa Rosa, California
Railroad Square in Tallahassee, Florida